The King Baudouin Stadium is a sports ground in Brussels, Belgium. Located in the north-western district of the City of Brussels, it was built to embellish the Heysel/Heizel Plateau in view of the 1935 Brussels International Exposition. It was inaugurated on 23 August 1930, with Crown Prince Leopold attending the opening ceremony. The stadium hosted 70,000 at the time. Its name honours King Baudouin, Leopold's son and successor as King of the Belgians, from 1951 to his death in 1993.

History

Early history
The first version of the King Baudouin Stadium was built in 1929–30 by the architect Joseph Van Neck, also chief architect of the 1935 Brussels International Exposition, in a classical modernist style. Its original name was the Jubilee Stadium because it was inaugurated as part of the centenary celebrations of the Belgian Revolution, with an unofficial Belgium–Netherlands football match.

In 1946, the stadium was stripped of the wood of its cycling track, and was renamed the Heysel Stadium, after the neighbourhood in which it is located. In 1971, a tartan track was installed allowing the organisation of athletics competitions. Three years later, in 1974, a new lighting system was installed.

The Heysel Stadium hosted European Cup finals in 1958, 1966, 1974, and 1985 and Cup Winners' Cup finals in 1964, 1976 and 1980. The highest attendance at a European game was over 69,000 in 1958.

May 1985 disaster

Despite its status as Belgium's national stadium, the Heysel Stadium was not well maintained. The stadium's poor condition manifested itself at the 1985 European Cup Final. For example, the outer wall had been made of cinder block, and fans who did not have tickets were seen kicking holes in it to get in. Additionally, the only escape route led upward, and there were only three gates on each short side–nowhere near enough for the 22,000 people standing on the terraces on either side.

The stadium's inadequacies had been well known for some time. When Arsenal played there in the early 1980s, its supporters ridiculed it as a "dump." Indeed, the presidents of the two 1985 European finalists, Juventus and Liverpool, had concluded that Heysel was in no condition to host a European Final, especially one featuring two of the largest and most powerful clubs in Europe at the time. They urged UEFA to move the match to another ground, to no avail. It later emerged that UEFA had only spent half an hour inspecting the stadium.

The Heysel Stadium disaster resulted in the deaths of 39 Juventus spectators after they were attacked by Liverpool fans before the match. Despite this, the stadium continued to be used for Belgium international games from 1986 to 1990 with only minimal improvements made following the disaster. This was in part because the government had already drawn up plans to remodel the stadium into a 35,000-seat facility. Finally, in 1990, UEFA forced the issue by barring Belgium from hosting a European Final until at least 2000. It also continued to host track and field events and it still hosts the Memorial Van Damme every year.

Modernisations
In 1995, a decade after the disaster, the ground was rebuilt at a cost of BEF 1,500 million (around €37/$50 million in 1995), and at this time renamed King Baudouin Stadium, after the Belgian monarch who had died two years previously.  All that remains of the old stadium is a renovated gateway near the main entrance.  The new structure combined the football ground with a running track and facilities for field events. It was re-opened on 23 August 1995 as the home of the Belgium national football team and is the largest stadium in Belgium; it can seat 50,093 spectators. The remodelled stadium hosted the 1996 European Cup Winners Cup final, as well as the opening game for Euro 2000.

On 26 May 2006, the Belgian Football Association decided not to use the King Baudouin Stadium anymore for the national team home matches and for the Cup final, because the gates of stand one were too narrow and the stadium was deemed unsafe. The next match of the national team was thus held at the Constant Vanden Stock Stadium. The City of Brussels complained that contrary to these claims the stadium was safe, and this complaint was upheld in court. On 6 October 2006, the Belgian Football Association met with representatives of the City of Brussels and they agreed to renew the contract and extend it to 30 June 2008.

In March 2019, the Belgian football association announced plans for a new redevelopment of the King Baudouin Stadium. The stadium would be rebuilt to a reduced capacity of 40,000 spectators and renamed to the Golden Generation Arena with a prospective completion date of 2022. That idea was quietly discarded. An architectural firm has never been appointed, an environmental study ordered or a client sought. From the politicians, who were said to be positive about the idea across party lines in the beginning, hardly anything is moving.

Rugby Union

On 25 August 2007, Belgium played Argentina in rugby union as part of Argentina's 2007 Rugby World Cup preparations. Argentina defeated Belgium 36–8.

The stadium was scheduled to witness a rugby union milestone on 19 December 2009, when the Parisian club Stade Français planned to take their Heineken Cup home match against Irish club Ulster to the stadium in a match that had sold more than 30,000 tickets. However, heavy snowfall in Brussels on the intended matchday forced the cancellation of what would have been the first Heineken Cup match held in Belgium; the fixture was instead played the following day in Paris.

The stadium had another shot at hosting a Heineken Cup match in 2012. On 20 October 2012, English club Saracens took their Heineken Cup pool match against Racing Métro to Brussels.

Other events
On 8 July 2010, the stadium played host to the Best of Belgium gala which featured a tennis match originally scheduled to be between Justine Henin and Kim Clijsters. Unfortunately Henin had to pull out and Serena Williams replaced her as the match was played in front of the largest crowd ever for a single match, beating the attendance set at the Battle of the Sexes.

Irish Rock band U2 performed at the stadium four times: the first one was on 10 June 2005 during their Vertigo Tour, in front of a sold-out crowd of 60,299 people. The second and the third were on 22 and 23 September 2010 during their U2 360° Tour, in front of a total sold-out crowd of 144,338 people. The performance of "Mercy" from the first 2010 show was recorded for the group's live EP Wide Awake in Europe. The performance of "I Will Follow" from the same show was recorded for the group's live album From the Ground Up: Edge's Picks from U2360°. Their fourth and last performance at the venue was on 1 August 2017 during their The Joshua Tree Tour 2017, in front of a sold-out crowd of 51,951 people.

The Rolling Stones, Celine Dion, Madonna, Mylène Farmer, Genesis, Robbie Williams, Bon Jovi, Bruce Springsteen, Beyoncé, One Direction, Ed Sheeran and Johnny Hallyday have also played concerts at the stadium. In 2019, Metallica and Rammstein played a sold-out concert at the stadium on 16 June and 10 July, respectively. 

Coldplay performed two sold out shows at the stadium on 21 and 22 June 2017 as part of their A Head Full of Dreams Tour. On 26 October 2021, the band scored the fastest ticket sales in the venue's history, moving 150,000 admissions during a single morning and adding a fourth date to support high demand. The shows were held on 5, 6, 8 and 9 August 2022. With these shows, the band became the first act to perform three and four shows at the stadium, as well as the first act to sell over 200,000 tickets. Additionally, they broke the record for highest attendance of all time, with 224,719 spectators in total.

The Weeknd will perform at the stadium on 11 July 2023 as part of his After Hours til Dawn Tour.

Heysel Stadium Silver Coin
To celebrate the 75th anniversary of the stadium, the Belgian State released a commemorative coin: the 10 euro 75 years of Heysel Stadium commemorative coin. The obverse depicts an image of a footballer with the stadium in the background. The flags of Belgium and the Netherlands can be seen on top of the stadium as well as the year that the stadium was built.

UEFA Euro 2000 matches

See also
 Heysel Stadium disaster
 List of association football stadiums by capacity
 List of tennis stadiums by capacity

References

Notes

External links

 Belgian FA official website – history
 Belgian FA official website – history
 King Baudouin Stadium – information & photo

National stadiums
UEFA Euro 1972 stadiums
Sports venues completed in 1930
1930 establishments in Belgium
Athletics (track and field) venues in Belgium
UEFA Euro 2000 stadiums in Belgium
Football venues in Brussels
UEFA European Championship final stadiums
Sports venues in Brussels
Diamond League venues